Sultan Abdulmajeed Al-Hebshi (born 31 January 1985 or 23 February 1983) is a Saudi Arabian shot putter.

His personal best was set at the 2009 Doha meeting, throwing a new area record of 21.13 m and finishing in third, only behind Olympic champion Tomasz Majewski and World Champion Reese Hoffa.

Competition record

References

1985 births
Living people
Saudi Arabian male shot putters
Athletes (track and field) at the 2008 Summer Olympics
Olympic athletes of Saudi Arabia
Asian Games gold medalists for Saudi Arabia
Asian Games medalists in athletics (track and field)
Athletes (track and field) at the 2002 Asian Games
Athletes (track and field) at the 2006 Asian Games
Athletes (track and field) at the 2010 Asian Games
Athletes (track and field) at the 2014 Asian Games
Athletes (track and field) at the 2018 Asian Games
Medalists at the 2006 Asian Games
Medalists at the 2010 Asian Games
Medalists at the 2014 Asian Games
Islamic Solidarity Games competitors for Saudi Arabia
Islamic Solidarity Games medalists in athletics
20th-century Saudi Arabian people
21st-century Saudi Arabian people